Simorgh County is in Mazandaran province, Iran. The capital of the county is the city of Kiakola. At the 2006 census, the region's population (as Kiakola District of Qaem Shahr County) was 17,914 in 4,800 households. The following census in 2011 counted 18,324 people in 5,585 households. At the 2016 census, the population was 19,376 in the newly formed Simorgh County, in 6,636 households.

Administrative divisions

The population history and structural changes of Simorgh County's administrative divisions over three consecutive censuses are shown in the following table. The latest census shows two districts, four rural districts, and one city.

References

 

Counties of Mazandaran Province